Colonial Glacier is in North Cascades National Park in the U.S. state of Washington and is immediately northwest of Neve Peak. The reduction in size of the glaciers of the North Cascades will reduce summertime meltwater runoff which is used to maintain a steady supply of electricity from hydroelectric power plants.

See also
List of glaciers in the United States

References

Glaciers of the North Cascades
Glaciers of Whatcom County, Washington
Glaciers of Washington (state)